Laugh Comics Digest was a publication of Archie Comics that lasted for 200 issues from August 1974 through April 2005. The title was noteworthy because it was not restricted to any character—it often included reprints of stories featuring the popular spinoff character Sabrina, the Teenage Witch, as well as That Wilkin Boy and Super Duck, and sometimes even included reprints from the very obscure title Cosmo the Merry Martian.

The title was first published as Laugh Comics Digest, then the name was later changed to Laugh Comics Digest Magazine, and finally it was changed to Laugh Digest Magazine.

In 2005, the title was cancelled and replaced with a new title, Tales From Riverdale Digest.

References

External links
 Cover art for issues 1 through 49 of Laugh Digest
 Laugh Digest at The Big DataBase of Comic Books
 Article on Laugh Comics Digest at atomicavenue.com

1974 comics debuts
2005 comics endings
Bimonthly magazines published in the United States
Comics magazines published in the United States
Archie Comics titles
Comic book digests
Defunct American comics
Magazines established in 1974
Magazines disestablished in 2005
Romantic comedy comics
Teen comedy comics